Transcription factor SOX-14 is a protein that in humans is encoded by the SOX14 gene.

Function 

This intronless gene encodes a member of the SOX (SRY-related HMG-box) family of transcription factors involved in the regulation of embryonic development and in the determination of the cell fate. The encoded protein may act as a transcriptional regulator after forming a protein complex with other proteins. Mutations in this gene are suggested to be responsible for the limb defects associated with blepharophimosis, ptosis, epicanthus inversus syndrome (BPES) and Mobius syndrome.

References

Further reading 

 
 
 
 
 
 

Transcription factors